Gero Kretschmer and Alexander Satschko were the defending champions but chose not to defend their title.

Santiago González and Artem Sitak won the title after defeating Luke Saville and John-Patrick Smith 6–3, 1–6, [10–5] in the final.

Seeds

Draw

References
 Main Draw

Jalisco Open - Doubles
2017 Doubles